Saint Romanus of Condat (also known in English as Saint Roman; French: Romain de Condat or Romain du Jura) ( – ) is a saint of the fifth century.  At the age of thirty five he decided to live as a hermit in the area of Condat.  His younger brother Lupicinus followed him there.  They became leaders of a community of monks that included Saint Eugendus.

Romanus and Lupicinus founded several monasteries.  These included Condat Abbey, which was the nucleus of the later town of Saint-Claude, Jura), Lauconne (later Saint-Lupicin, as Lupicinus was buried there), La Balme (Beaume) (later Saint-Romain-de-Roche), where Romanus was buried, and Romainmôtier (Romanum monasterium), now in the canton of Vaud in Switzerland.

Romanus was ordained a priest by St. Hilary of Arles in 444.

Sources on Romanus
Two lives of him are in existence: one by Gregory of Tours in the Liber vitae patrum (Mon. Germ. Hist.: Script. Merov., I, 663), and an anonymous Vita Sanctorum Romani, Lupicini, Eugendi [ibid., III, 131 sqq.; cf. Benoît, "Histoire de St-Claude", I (Paris, 1890); Besson, "Recherches sur les origines des évêchés de Genève, Lausanne, et Sion" (Fribourg, 1906), 210 sqq.].

References

External links
Romanus of Condat
Saints Romanus

5th-century Christian clergy
French hermits
5th-century Christian saints
Gallo-Roman saints
463 deaths